Nobar is an ancient and historical district in south of Tabriz, Iran. Nobar bath and Saat Tower are located in this district. The Saat Tower was built by in 1934 at the site of the historical cemetery of the Nobar district.

Sources
ذوقی، فریبرز و نیکنام لاله، ایوب. تبریز در گذر تاریخ. چاپ اول. تبریز: انتشارات یاران، ۱۳۷۴.

Districts of Tabriz